Eugene Lamont Johnson (born April 20, 1955, in Highland Park, Michigan), commonly known as E Lamont Johnson or Lamont Johnson, is an American musician. He was the lead singer of the composition "This Must Be Heaven" and electric fretless bassist of the R&B band Brainstorm. As a result of his electric fretless bass work throughout the mid-1970s, he gained recognition for being the first internationally recognized electric fretless bassist in R&B music.

After leaving Brainstorm in 1978, he recorded two solo albums for CBS Records. He recorded an album with American disco group Niteflyte for Ariola Records. He is a notable bass instructor in the Detroit area, and many have sought his electric bass instruction since the mid-1970s.

Discography

Studio albums
1977: Together (with Gloster Williams & The King James Version) 
1977: Stormin (With Brainstorm)
1978: On My Way (with Hamilton Bohannon)
1978: First Time Out (with Jimmy McKee)
1978: Physical Attraction (with Keith Barrow)
1978: Music of The Sun
1979: Niteflyte
1979: Chapter 8
1981: Was (Not Was)
1985: Double Dip (with Robert Lowe)

Singles
1978: "Sister Fine"
1978: "Hey Girl"
1979: "If You Want It"(With Niteflyte)
1980: "Masta Luva"
1980: "Rock You Baby"
1984: "The Heart Is a Hunter" (With The Stingrays)

References

External links
Lamont Johnson's website
Discography

1955 births
Living people
People from Hamtramck, Michigan
20th-century American bass guitarists